Canoeing at the 2010 South American Games in Medellín was held from March 27 to March 29. All games were played at Villa Náutica Embalse de Guatapé.

Medal summary

Medal table

Men

Women

References

 
Canoeing
South American Games
2010 South American Games